2006–07 was the eighth season that Division 1 functioned as the third-level of ice hockey in Sweden, below the second-level HockeyAllsvenskan and the top-level Elitserien (now the SHL).

Format 
The 52 participating teams played the first half of the season in six groups divided geographically. The successful teams then moved into three new groups (the Allettan groups), while the remaining teams played in a continuation of their smaller existing groups. The teams with the worst records in these continuation groups were then forced to defend their places in Division 1 against challengers from Division 2 (see "relegation tournament" below) in a round-robin tournament called Kvalserien till Division 1. Meanwhile, the successful teams from the Allettan groups along with the group winners of the continuation groups played a playoff to determine who would have a chance to compete for promotion to the second-tier league HockeyAllsvenskan in Kvalserien till HockeyAllsvenskan.

First round

Division 1A

Division 1B

Division 1C

Division 1D

Division 1E

Division 1F

AllEttan

Northern Group

Western Group

Eastern Group

Southern Group

Playoffs 
 Kristianstads IK - Väsby IK 0:4/2:7
 Örebro HK - Piteå HC 3:5/1:2 OT
 AIK Härnösand - Tingsryds AIF 3:6/2:4
 IF Troja-Ljungby - Borås HC 1:6/1:2

Qualification round

Division 1A

Division 1B

Division 1C

Division 1D

Division 1E

Division 1F

Relegation

Division 1A 
 Lycksele - Bodens HF 2:4/1:6

Division 1B 
Kramfors qualified for the league.

Division 1C 
Falu and Uppsala qualified for the league.

Division 1D 
Skå was promoted to the league, while Vallentuna was relegated.

Division 1E 
Hammarö and Munkfors were promoted to the league.

Division 1F 
Göteborg and Ulricehamn were promoted to the league.

External links 
 Season on hockeyarchives.info

3
Swedish Division I seasons